Sclerococcum sipmanii is a rare species of lichenicolous fungus in the family Dactylosporaceae. Found in Malaysia, it was formally described as a new species in 2015 by Belgian mycologist Paul Diederich. The fungus forms black, convex, rounded sporodochia typically measuring 100–200 μm in diameter; the fungus does not otherwise cause visible damage to the host lichen. Sclerococcum sipmanii is only known to occur at the type locality. The species epithet honours Dutch lichenologist Harrie Sipman, one of the collectors of the type.

References

Lecanorales
Lichen species
Lichens described in 2015
Lichenicolous fungi